The World Seniors Tour is the snooker tour for senior players. Its events are open to male and female players who are aged 40 or older and ranked outside the top 64 in the snooker world rankings. Founded in 2017 by Snooker Legends, the tour has been run since 2018 by World Seniors Snooker, a subsidiary company of the World Professional Billiards and Snooker Association. Winners of the UK Seniors Championship and World Seniors Championship earn places in the World Snooker Championship qualifying rounds.

History
The tour was created and run by the company Snooker Legends in 2017, after it first staged the 2017 World Seniors Championship.

The World Seniors Tour began with a series of four non-ranking events in the 2017–18 season: the UK Seniors Championship, the Seniors Irish Masters, the Seniors Masters and the World Seniors Championship.

In 2018, a newly formed company called World Seniors Snooker took over the running of the tour. Six events were to take place during the 2018–19 season. However, only four of the events were staged. The European Seniors Open was cancelled and the World Seniors Championship was postponed in March 2019. It was pushed back and played in August 2019, becoming the first event of the 2019–20 season. Other qualifying events for amateurs were held in Canada, Hong Kong, Belgium and the United States.

The 2019–20 season of the World Seniors Tour was affected by the COVID-19 pandemic. The Seniors Masters, Seniors Irish Masters, 6 Red World Championship and a new event, the British Seniors Open, were all cancelled. Due to the ongoing coronavirus situation the 2020-21 seniors season was restricted to just a seniors Q-School in January 2021, and the 2021 World Seniors Championship in May, at the Crucible Theatre.

Seasons and results

References

External links 
 
 

 
Snooker governing bodies
Organisations based in Bristol
Sports organizations established in 2017
2017 establishments in the United Kingdom
Snooker competitions in the United Kingdom
Snooker tours and series
Senior sports competitions
Snooker amateur competitions